("I Will Praise the Lord of Wisdom"), also sometimes known in English as The Poem of the Righteous Sufferer, is a Mesopotamian poem (ANET, pp. 434–437) written in Akkadian that concerns itself with the problem of the unjust suffering of an afflicted man, named Šubši-mašrâ-Šakkan (Shubshi-meshre-Shakkan). The author is tormented, but he does not know why. He has been faithful in all of his duties to the gods. He speculates that perhaps what is good to man is evil to the gods and vice versa. He is ultimately delivered from his sufferings. It is thought to have been composed during the reign of Kassite king of Babylon Nazi-Maruttaš, who is mentioned on line 105 of tablet IV.

The poem was written on four tablets in its canonical form and consisted of 480 lines. Alternate names for the poem include the Poem of the Righteous Sufferer or the Babylonian Job. According to William Moran, the work is a hymn of thanksgiving to Marduk for recovery from illness.

The first (but now outdated) edition of the poem was published by W. G. Lambert in 1960 (reprinted in 1996). Amar Annus and Alan Lenzi have edited in 2010 a new edition of the poem for the Neo-Assyrian Text Corpus Project. This volume was published as State Archive of Assyria Cuneiform Text 7 (SAACT 7). The new edition includes tablets published by Wiseman, George and Al-Rawi, Horowitz and Lambert, and several other unpublished tablets from the British Museum.

Šubši-mašrâ-Šakkan
According to the text, he occupied high office, had slaves and fields, a family and spoke of the city as if it were subject to his rule. An official of the same name appears in two other documents dated to his reign.

The sources
A tablet recovered in Nippur lists grain rations given to the messenger of a certain Šubši-mašrâ-Šakkan during Nazi-Marrutaš' fourth year (1304 BC). There is a court order found in Ur, dated to the sixteenth year of Nazi-Maruttaš (1292 BC), in which Šubši-mašrâ-šakkan is given the title , "governor of the country." It is an injunction forbidding harvesting reeds from a certain river or canal.

The poetic work, describes how the fortunes of Šubši-mašrâ-Šakkan, a rich man of high rank, turned one day. When beset by ominous signs, he incurred the wrath of the king, and seven courtiers plotted every kind of mischief against him. This resulted in him losing his property, "they have divided all my possessions among foreign riffraff," friends, "my city frowns on me as an enemy; indeed my land is savage and hostile," physical strength, "my flesh is flaccid, and my blood has ebbed away," and health, as he relates that he "wallowed in my excrement like a sheep." The work concludes with a prayer to Marduk. The text is written in the first person, leading some to speculate that the author was Šubši-mašrâ-Šakkan himself. Perhaps the only certainty is that the subject of the work, Šubši-mašrâ-Šakkan, was a significant historical person during the reign of Nazi-Maruttaš when the work was set. Of the fifty-eight extant fragmentary copies of  the great majority date to the neo-Assyrian and neo-Babylonian periods.

See also
Book of Job
Problem of evil

References

External links
 *Righteous Sufferer (Ludlul bēl nēmeqi) Critical edition and translation of the text (electronic Babylonian Library).
 W.G. Lambert (1960) "The Poem of the Righteous Sufferer", Babylonian Wisdom Literature (Internet Archive)

14th-century BC literature
13th-century BC literature
Ancient Near East wisdom literature
Akkadian literature
Religious poetry
Theodicy
Poems
13th-century BC people
14th-century BC people